Suslovka is a rural locality (a village) in Andreyevskoye Rural Settlement, Alexandrovsky District, Vladimir Oblast, Russia. The population was 3 as of 2010.

Geography 
Suslovka is located 28 km northeast of Alexandrov (the district's administrative centre) by road. Bazunovo is the nearest rural locality.

References 

Rural localities in Alexandrovsky District, Vladimir Oblast